Wilfrid II (died on 29 April in either 745 or 746), name also spelled Wilfrith, also known as Wilfrid the Younger, was the last Bishop of York, as the see was converted to an archbishopric during the time of his successor.

Life

Wilfrid was a monk at Whitby and studied there when Hilda was abbess. In 718 he was consecrated as coadjutor bishop to John of Beverley.

Wilfrid was described as a very holy man, and interested in education.

Wilfrid resigned the bishopric in 732. He died on 29 April in either 745 or 746, and was buried at Ripon, but it may have been his body that was later translated to Canterbury in the mistaken belief that it was that of the earlier Wilfrid. The younger Wilfrid is considered a saint, with his feast day being 29 April. However, he was never the object of strong cult, and only occasional mentions of him occur in martyrologies.

Citations

References

External links
 

Bishops of York
8th-century English bishops
745 deaths
Northumbrian saints
8th-century Christian saints
Year of birth unknown